Elizabeth Alison Thompson (born May 22, 1949) is a British-born American statistician at the University of Washington. Her research concerns the use of genetic data to infer relationships between individuals and populations. She is the 2017–2018 president of the International Biometric Society.

Education and career
Thompson studied at Newnham College, Cambridge, earning first-class honours in the mathematical tripos in 1970 and completing a diploma in mathematical statistics in 1971. She continued at Cambridge for graduate studies, earning a Ph.D. in statistics in 1974 under the supervision of A. W. F. Edwards.

After postdoctoral studies at Stanford University she returned to Cambridge as a lecturer in mathematics and mathematical statistics and fellow of King's College, Cambridge. She became a fellow of Newnham in 1981. She moved to the Department of Statistics at the University of Washington in 1985, and added a joint appointment to the Department of Biostatistics in 1988. She became a U.S. citizen in 1997.

Awards and honors
Thompson received an honorary doctorate from Cambridge in 1988, and became an honorary fellow of Newnham in 2013.

She became a fellow of the American Academy of Arts and Sciences in 1998.
In 2008 she joined the National Academy of Sciences.

She is the Carnegie Centenary Professor for 2017 at the University of St Andrews.

Selected publications

References

External links
Home page

1949 births
Living people
American statisticians
English statisticians
Women statisticians
Alumni of Newnham College, Cambridge
Fellows of King's College, Cambridge
Fellows of Newnham College, Cambridge
Fellows of the American Academy of Arts and Sciences
Members of the United States National Academy of Sciences
University of Washington faculty